Unitedville village is a village located Cayo District, Belize. Unitedville is home to 974 persons with the main ethnic groups being Creoles the most numerous and seconded by the Mestizos.  The main livelihood activity in this community is traditionally subsistence farming.  Residents produce much of their own food, such as corn, ground food, beans, some rice, various tropical fruits, chickens and small livestock.  Surplus production was sold.  All members of the family generally participate in this activity. Thus, the families develop strong, united relationships. Unitedville is closer to San Ignacio, as opposed to Belmopan, and as such the villagers shop and recreate in that town rather than in the capital.  Villagers of Unitedville relate to Belmopan mainly for administrative services.  Recently, there is an increasing trend in the number of younger members of the village engaged in the fields of construction and the public service.

Demographics
The population of the village is 974.

History
The origin of this community goes back to the time when the Belize (Old) River was the main avenue of transportation to the west of the then colony of British Honduras.  At that time many small posts were established along the river providing various services to travelers and workers of the profitable timber and chicle extraction from the western forests of British Honduras.

To develop the colony, more efficient means of transportation was inevitable, thus a cart road was established connecting the western communities to the capital Belize city.  With this, the communities shifted to the locations along the cart road but still near the river where they did subsistence farming.  In light of this, the first settlers of what is now Unitedville established their community on the banks of small Barton Creek, and called the community small Barton Creek.  The paved George Price Highway now facilitates transportation to the west of the country.

Freedom Struggle
Sometime later, Belize was experiencing a strong drive to attain its independence from the British and establish the independent Nation of Belize.  The Leader of this Peaceful Constructive Revolution was The Honorable George Cadle Price.  In order to have citizens of the new nation in Central America, George price set out to have the people consider themselves with a new identity united to form the country of Belize; thus many communities were renamed.  As a result, the community of Small Barton Creek was renamed  “Unitedville”.  Other examples of renamed communities are “Esperanza”, and “Georgeville”.

Sports
Baseball ( Unitedville Rebels )
Football ( astros )
School also participates in football tournaments such as Bishopcup

Populated places in Cayo District
Cayo South